Henry George Webster, CBE (27 May 1917 – 6 February 2007) was a British automotive engineer who worked on Triumph cars throughout the 1950s and 1960s.

Career

Harry Webster was born in Coventry in 1917, and educated at Welshpool County School and Coventry Technical College.  He stayed in Coventry to join the Standard Motor Company in 1932 as an apprentice, spending six years in Standard's aircraft engineering operation during the Second World War, after which he returned to the car chassis design department in Coventry.  Following Standard's acquisition of the Triumph Motor Company in 1946, Webster's design and chassis engineering abilities helped to revive the Triumph marque through the 1950s.  In 1957 Webster became Triumph's director of engineering, and in 1967 he was appointed chief executive engineer at Leyland Motors, which had by then acquired Standard-Triumph.  In 1968, following the merger of British Motor Holdings and Leyland Motors to form British Leyland Motor Corporation (BLMC) he succeeded Alec Issigonis as BLMC's technical director.

Webster worked on Triumph's TR series of sports cars, which included the TR2, TR3, TR4, and TR5 (the first British sports car to have fuel injection fitted as standard) and brought in Italian stylist Giovanni Michelotti to work with him on the TR4, Herald, Vitesse, Spitfire, 2000, and Stag.

In 1974 he was appointed CBE for his contribution to the motor industry, and the same year, after resigning from BLMC he joined Leamington Spa-based brake and clutch manufacturer Automotive Products as group technical director.  He retired in 1982 and lived in Kenilworth, where he had moved to in the late 1950s, until his death in 2007.

References

Related links
 
 Hemmings Motor News: Henry George Webster
 Standard Motor Club: Harry Webster

Commanders of the Order of the British Empire
1917 births
2007 deaths
British automotive engineers